Background

Yolanda Awel Deng is a South Sudanese politician who is currently the minister of Health, in the South Sudan Transitional Government of National Unity cabinet as for the year 2022.

She hails from Warrap State of Barhr El Ghazel region.

Education

Yolanda Awel graduated with Bachelor Degree in Psychology from the University Saskatchewan and later Master's Degree in Conflict Analysis and Management from Royal Road University in Canada.

Appointment

She was Appointed by President Salva Kiir as the South Sudan National Minister of Health in March 2022 through the ticket of South Sudan People's Liberation Movement-In Opposition (SPLM-IO) replacing Elizabeth Achuei.

Yolanda Awel Deng married Agel Ring Machar, the former Press Secretary in the office of the then former First Vice President, Taban Deng Gai in 2011. She is a mother of four children, two boys and two girls.

References

21st-century South Sudanese politicians
Living people
Year of birth missing (living people)
Place of birth missing (living people)
21st-century South Sudanese women politicians
Government ministers of South Sudan
Women government ministers of South Sudan
University of Saskatchewan alumni
Royal Roads University alumni